Rached is a surname and a given name. It may refer to:

 Choubeila Rached (1933-2008), Tunisian singer
 Emil Assad Rached (1943-2009), Brazilian basketball player
 Emilio Rached (born 1959), Argentine politician
 Tahani Rached (born 1947), Canadian-Egyptian documentary filmmaker
 Rached Ghannouchi (born 1941), Tunisian politician
 Rached Merdassi, Tunisian boxer, 2007 All-Africa Games welterweight champion

See also
 Rashid (name), also spelled Rachid, another surname and given name